Ayanda Gcaba (born 8 March 1986) is a South African international footballer who plays for Sinenkani, as a defender.

Club career
Born in Port Shepstone, Gcaba began his career with Barberton City Stars, before playing professionally with Free State Stars, Orlando Pirates, Platinum Stars, Royal Eagles and Jomo Cosmos.

In December 2017 he stated he wanted to leave Orlando Pirates. He moved to Platinum Stars on loan in January 2018.

He joined Royal Eagles in September 2019, before leaving the club in January 2020 amongst rumours that he had been fired by the club after driving the team bus, which he denied.

He began training with Jomo Cosmos in October 2020, signing with the club in November 2020. He moved to Sinenkani in 2022.

International career

He made his international debut for South Africa in 2012.

References

1986 births
Living people
People from Port Shepstone
Soccer players from KwaZulu-Natal
South African soccer players
South Africa international soccer players
Free State Stars F.C. players
Orlando Pirates F.C. players
Platinum Stars F.C. players
Royal Eagles F.C. players
Jomo Cosmos F.C. players
National First Division players
South African Premier Division players
Association football defenders
2015 Africa Cup of Nations players